Enfants Riches Déprimés (also known as ERD) is a Los Angeles and Paris based luxury fashion brand founded by the conceptual artist, Henri Levy  (also known as Henri Alexander Levy).

History 

ERD was founded in late 2012 by Henri Alexander as an Avant-garde fashion collective, in an effort to create a French punk streetwear line based on the movements of the late 1970s and Japanese Avant-garde movements of the 1980s.

One of the core precepts of the brand is high price points, with T-shirts ranging on average from $500 to $1,000, and haute couture jackets priced as high as $95,000.  ERD consistently utilizes the business model of artificial scarcity.  In this regard, all styles are sold on an extremely exclusive basis, and thus in relatively small quantities.  "The price point is not only a marker of value, but intrinsically part of the piece itself," Alexander remarked in a 2015 interview with The Guardian. He further noted that, "No pieces are alike and everything is limited.  I have no interest in making affordable pieces for the masses."

Consistent with this perspective, the artist further noted in a 2016 interview with Complex Magazine that, "The best way for me to explain the brand is elitist, nihilist couture…The price point eliminates the masses, and the ideas eliminate the people who I don't want, generally, in it, due to the dark nature."

The originality of ERD's designs has also resulted in other brands appropriating similar designs and styles, most notably Gucci, Balmain and Vetements.  ERD has made a point to be extremely particular with respect to accepting new stockists.  Enfants reportedly informed stores in 2017 that if there is any evidence of carrying brands that copy ERD or feature "mid-level contemporary bullshit," the brand will categorically prohibit those stores from carrying the brand.

Enfants Riches Déprimés began with just a small handful of stockists in 2012.  From 2013 to 2014, the label quietly garnered a following amongst celebrities, including Jared Leto, Kanye West, Pusha T, Beyoncé, G Dragon, Sky Ferreira, Courtney Love, Frances Bean Cobain, Justin Bieber, Guns N' Roses, and Zayn Malik.

From 2015 to 2017, Enfants Riches Déprimés has experienced significant business growth, notably with its garments being stocked by Patron of the New, Maxfield, SSENSE, Selfridges, 10 Corso Como, Luisa Via Roma, and Trois Pommes.  The brand has also earned considerable artistic acclaim in the fashion world with Alexander's trailblazing and particularly confrontational and provocative designs.  These garments have catapulted the brand to an unprecedented level.

Enfants Riches Déprimés unveiled its SS18 pre-collection at Christie's Paris in June 2017, the first time in which a fashion house has shown at the historic auction house, founded in 1766. For its SS23 collection held at Lycée Henri IV in Paris in October 2022, Enfants Riches Déprimés unveiled politically and morally motivated garments that would continue to propel its counterculture brand imagery and ethos, such as references to the founder of the People's Republic of China, Mao Zedong and American serial killer, Aileen Wuornos.

Influences 

Enfants Riches Déprimés has taken inspiration from a variety of historical sources.  In an interview with V Magazine, Henri Alexander commented that "As far as other painters I am really into Robert Motherwell.  I'm envious of the scale of his work.  Also, [the work of ] Cy Twombly, Antoni Tàpies and Jean Dubuffet…I find particularly appealing at this point in my life. I think those that are familiar with Tàpies' work, will see he has influenced ERD from the informality to the way he uses furniture and rags."   The artist has also noted being influenced by Japanese fashion designers Rei Kawakubo And Yohji Yamamoto, artist Raymond Pettibon, and punk rockers Darby Crash and Johnny Thunders.

Collaborations 

In 2012, the brand did a limited T-shirt release with Young & Starving, a New York nonprofit organization that works to support budding artists and curators.  In 2015, the brand collaborated with Vans to create a custom classic high-top sneaker, featuring hand-drawings and "rebellious scribbling". For their Fall Winter 2016 collection, ERD collaborated with the estate of Cy Twombly to create a capsule collection featuring interpretations of the late artist's polaroid works.

ERD has also had a continuing relationship with the contemporary artist and architect, Didier Faustino.  His sculpture was notably featured as the centerpiece of their Paris runway show in September 2016, which premiered the brand's Spring Summer 2017 main collection.

In early 2017, Enfants Riches Déprimés collaborated with Daft Punk for their store at Maxfield in Los Angeles.

In late 2016, Henri Alexander  was introduced to Kanye West.  Directly following his release from the hospital after being admitted for psychological evaluation, West was photographed in December 2016 visiting ERD's Los Angeles studio.  There have reportedly been rumors circulating that Alexander and West are working on a collaboration for 2017.

In July 2017, Enfants Riches Déprimés launched a pop-up store at Maxfield, transforming the sprawling space into a pawn shop.  The shop featured a capsule collection of archival pieces, as well as a number of new limited edition styles.

In June 2019, Enfants Riches Déprimés collaborated in the artistic design of Future's EP Save Me with the cover being one of his paintings and all the music videos made for the EP directed by him.

References 

High fashion brands
Luxury brands
Clothing brands of the United States
Clothing retailers of the United States
Fashion accessory brands
Jewelry retailers of the United States
Shoe companies of the United States
Companies based in Los Angeles
American companies established in 2012
Clothing companies established in 2012
Retail companies established in 2012
2012 establishments in California